Ryan Held (born November 23, 1974) is an American football coach who is the head football coach at the University of Nebraska at Kearney. He was previously the running backs coach at University of Nebraska–Lincoln and was hired in that role in December 2017, after serving in that same position at the University of Central Florida in Orlando, Florida since 2016. Prior to that, he had served as the head coach at Peru State as well as several college and teams in Kansas and Oklahoma.

Early life and playing career
Held was a two-time national champion himself as a Husker from 1993 to 1996. Nebraska posted a 47-3 record during Held’s career with three conference titles. At Nebraska, Held was a teammate of Scott Frost during the 1995 and 1996 seasons.

Coaching career

First stint at Nebraska
As a senior at Nebraska, Held coached the Huskers as a student assistant in 1997, helping them to a 13−0 record and a national title.

Tennessee
As a defensive graduate assistant at Tennessee in 1998 and 1999, he was a part the Volunteers staff that won the 1998 national championship.

Peru State
In 2001, Held became the youngest head football coach in the country (age 26), and he led the Peru State Bobcats to a 5−5 record and a second-place league finish in his only season.

Oklahoma Pandhandle
In 2002, Held took over an Oklahoma Panhandle State Aggies program that had only won two games in the previous three years. He led them to back-to-back winning seasons in 2003 and 2004.

SW Oklahoma State
Held  led the Southwestern Oklahoma State program for four seasons, from 2005 to 2008, guiding the team to a share of the Lone Star Conference North Division title in 2007, one year after he was named the division coach of the year.

Butler Community College
In 2011, Held was the offensive coordinator at Butler Community College where he led the team to an 11-1 record and finished as the #2 ranked offense in the country.

Highland Community College
In 2012, he took over a Highland Community College (Kansas) team that hadn't had a winning season since before 2000. In 2013, Highland made it to the playoffs for the first time in the modern era.

Northeast Oklahoma A&M
Held was the head coach for two seasons at Northeastern Oklahoma A&M College (2014–2015), where he coached 22 all-conference selections in his final season.

UCF
Held coached the running backs at UCF under head coach Scott Frost. He was part of a staff that led the nation’s most improved team in 2016 and posted the first perfect regular season in UCF and American Athletic Conference history in 2017. With help from Held’s running backs, the Knights’ offense showed dramatic improvement, increasing their scoring production by more than 35 points per game from 2015 to 2017 and their total offense output by more than 270 yards per game.

Held’s running backs helped UCF rush for nearly 2,500 yards during its undefeated regular season and run to the American Athletic Conference title in 2017. Adrian Killins Jr. averaged 6.8 yards per carry en route to earning all-conference accolades as a sophomore. Killins added 10 rushing touchdowns, including a 96-yard score in the regular-season matchup with Memphis, the longest rush and longest play from scrimmage in both UCF and AAC history. As a unit, Held’s running backs combined for 24 rushing touchdowns in 2017, including scores by six different backs. As a team, UCF ranked sixth nationally with 38 rushing touchdowns.

In Held’s first season at UCF in 2016, the Knights rushed for nearly 2,000 yards and three running backs, including more than 800 yards from freshmen. Killins averaged 6.5 yards per carry, while senior Dontravious Wilson scored eight rushing touchdowns after scoring only three times in his first three seasons combined.

Return to Nebraska
Held returned to his alma mater, Nebraska, in December 2017, when he was one of the first hires on Scott Frost's Husker staff. He was one of four offensive assistants dismissed on November 8, 2021, in a major reshuffle of the offensive staff.

North Alabama
In 2022, Held joined the staff at North Alabama as the associate head coach, offensive coordinator and quarterbacks coach.

Head coaching record

College

Junior college

References

External links
 Nebraska–Kearney profile
 North Alabama profile
 Nebraska player profile

1974 births
Living people
American football quarterbacks
American football wide receivers
Butler Grizzlies football coaches
Nebraska Cornhuskers football coaches
Nebraska Cornhuskers football players
Nebraska–Kearney Lopers football coaches
North Alabama Lions football coaches
Oklahoma Panhandle State Aggies football coaches
Peru State Bobcats football coaches
Southwestern Oklahoma State Bulldogs football coaches
UCF Knights football coaches
Junior college football coaches in the United States
Sportspeople from Overland Park, Kansas
Coaches of American football from Kansas
Players of American football from Kansas